Ranford Road is a major road in the southeastern suburbs of Perth, Western Australia, and services a number of housing estates in Canning Vale and Southern River, as well as forming part of one of the two major routes between the port city of Fremantle and Armadale. It continues from South Street, a major east-west route in the southern suburbs which now also provides access to the Kwinana Freeway and Murdoch railway station.

It is part of State Route 13.

History
Ranford Road was upgraded to a dual carriageway between Warton Road and Tonkin Highway. This project was completed in November 2014, costing around $12.3 million, which was jointly funded by the Metropolitan Redevelopment Authority and the City of Armadale.

In August 2020, construction began on a new Ranford Road Bridge over the Kwinana freight railway as part of the Thornlie-Cockburn Link works. The new bridge, which is higher and longer, will carry six traffic lanes and a dedicated bus lane. Traffic switched to part of the new bridge on 16 November 2021. Construction is expected to be completed by mid 2023.

Major intersections

 Bannister Road, Canning Vale
 Livingstone Drive
 Waratah Avenue
  Nicholson Road (State Route 31)
 Campbell Road
 Warton Road, Harrisdale/Southern River
 Southern River Road, Southern River
  Tonkin Highway (State Route 4), Forrestdale
  Armadale Road (State Route 14), Forrestdale

Speed limits

Features
Main features located on the road include:

 Market City (Canning Vale)
 Livingston Marketplace Shopping Centre
 Gosnells Golf Club
 WA Kennel Association
 Southern River Shopping Centre
 Housing estates (Boardwalk, Sanctuary Waters, The Avenues, Ranford, Livingston).

See also

References

External links

Roads in Perth, Western Australia